
Gmina Nowe Skalmierzyce is an urban-rural gmina (administrative district) in Ostrów Wielkopolski County, Greater Poland Voivodeship, in west-central Poland. In 1999 the administrative seat of the gmina was moved from the town of Nowe Skalmierzyce to the adjoining locality of Skalmierzyce, which is officially classed as a village. (This is now the only urban-rural gmina in Poland to have its seat outside the town; until 2009 it shared that status with Gmina Święta Katarzyna, now Gmina Siechnice.)

Villages
Apart from Skalmierzyce and Nowe Skalmierzyce, the gmina also contains the villages and settlements of Biskupice, Biskupice Ołoboczne, Boczków, Chotów, Czachory, Droszew, Fabianów, Gałązki Małe, Gałązki Wielkie, Głóski, Gniazdów, Gostyczyna, Kościuszków, Kotowiecko, Kurów, Leziona, Mączniki, Miedzianów, Ociąż, Osiek, Pawłów, Pawłówek, Śliwniki, Śmiłów, Strzegowa, Trkusów, Węgry and Żakowice.

Neighbouring gminas
Gmina Nowe Skalmierzyce is bordered by the city of Kalisz and by the gminas of Godziesze Wielkie, Gołuchów, Ostrów Wielkopolski and Sieroszewice.

References
Polish official population figures 2006

Nowe Skalmierzyce
Ostrów Wielkopolski County